The Civil Defence Cross of Honour is a medal which is awarded by the Directorate for Civil Protection and Emergency Planning of Norway to Norwegian civil defence personnel for helping to prevent loss of life or damage to equipment and property by act of ingenuity in perilous conditions. The medal was established 6 November 2003.

Appearance of the Award 
 The Civil Defence Cross of Honour is a silver cross.
 The obverse has blue-enamelled arms and a central medallion bearing a crowned lion holding a shield (the Civil Defence emblem).
 The reverse is plain silver, with Honor et caritas (Honour and Charity) inscribed in the centre.
 The ribbon is white/silver-grey with a double blue edge stripe.

References

Orders, decorations, and medals of Norway
Awards established in 2003
2003 establishments in Norway